Psychotria moseskemei is a species of plant in the family Rubiaceae. It is found in Cameroon and Nigeria. It is threatened by habitat loss.

References

moseskemei
Critically endangered plants
Taxonomy articles created by Polbot